Władysław Mazurkiewicz may refer to:
 Władysław Mazurkiewicz (physician) (1871–1933), physician, professor at University of Warsaw; helped Józef Piłsudski escape prison in St Petersburg
 Władysław Mazurkiewicz (serial killer) (1911–1957), Polish serial killer